Ariel Sganga (born February 25, 1974) is a male judoka from Argentina, who won the bronze medal in the men's half middleweight division (– 81 kg) at the 2003 Pan American Games in Santo Domingo, Dominican Republic. He represented his native country at the 2004 Summer Olympics in Athens, Greece.

Ariel Scanga -90 kg (ages 35–39) from Argentina took GOLD at the 4th IJF Grand Masters World Judo Championships in Miami.

References
 

1974 births
Living people
Argentine male judoka
Judoka at the 2003 Pan American Games
Judoka at the 2004 Summer Olympics
Olympic judoka of Argentina
Sportspeople from Buenos Aires
Pan American Games bronze medalists for Argentina
Pan American Games medalists in judo
South American Games bronze medalists for Argentina
South American Games medalists in judo
Competitors at the 2002 South American Games
Medalists at the 2003 Pan American Games
20th-century Argentine people
21st-century Argentine people